Suaqui Grande is a town in Suaqui Grande Municipality, in the eastern region of the Mexican state of Sonora. It was founded in 1620 by the missionary Martín Burgencio.

The main economic activities are cattle raising, growing of grass for cattle feed and subsistence agriculture.

External links
Suaqui Grande, Ayuntamiento Digital (Official Website of Suaqui Grande, Sonora)
Suaqui Grande, Sonora (Enciclopedia de los Municipios de México)

Populated places in Sonora